is a public high school located in Meirinchō, Uwajima, Ehime, Shikoku, Japan established in 1945 as the .

Overview
Established in 1945, Ehime Prefectural Uwajima Fisheries High School has produced a large number of alumni. The school was established on April 12, 1945 as an Ehime Prefectural Fisheries School with a capacity of 50 people. The school is the only fishery high school in Ehime Prefecture in Uwajima-shi, an area known for its production of Pagrus aquaculture and pearl aquaculture.

Ehime Maru and USS Greeneville collision

The school operated the vessel Ehime Maru (4th generation), which the USS Greenville, a U.S. Navy submarine, struck and sank on February 9, 2001 during the Ehime Maru and USS Greeneville collision.

The school acquired a new Ehime Maru (5th generation) ship with settlement money from the U.S. Navy. The new ship sailed to Hawaii in 2003. In Hawaii, the principal at the time of the disaster, Kazumitsu Joko (上甲 一光 Jōkō Kazumitsu), read a message from Moriyuki Kato (加戸 守行 Kato Moriyuki), the governor of Ehime Prefecture, addressed to the Hawaiian people.

References

External links

Ehime Prefectural Uwajima Fisheries High School Official website (Japanese)
The Hawaii Channel site on the Ehime-maru

Ehime Prefecture
Education in Ehime Prefecture
High schools in Ehime Prefecture
Educational institutions established in 1945
Schools in Ehime Prefecture
1945 establishments in Japan
Registered Monuments of Japan